Michael Winters (born February 21, 1945) is an American actor of stage and television. He is best known for playing uptight town selectman Taylor Doose on the WB series Gilmore Girls (2000-2007). He played the role for all seven seasons of the comedy-drama and reprised it for the 2016 revival Gilmore Girls: A Year in the Life.

Biography
On stage, Winters appeared on Broadway in Wrong Mountain. He spent seven seasons with the Oregon Shakespeare Company, including roles as King Lear and Falstaff. He has also played Prospero with the Seattle Shakespeare Company. He previously spent 10 years with the Pacific Conservatory of the Performing Arts and has performed with several other theater companies in Western USA.

His other screen credits include recurring roles on Days of Our Lives and Ally McBeal, and guest roles on Friends, The Nanny, Cheers, Frasier, and Law & Order.

Filmography

Film

Television

Theater

References

External links

Michael Winters at the Internet Broadway Database

1945 births
Living people
American male television actors
American male stage actors
American male Shakespearean actors
Place of birth missing (living people)
20th-century American male actors
21st-century American male actors